The Hakka Party is a minor party in Taiwan, aiming to represent the Hakka people. Their party leader is Tsai Chua Niu.

The Hakka Party developed out of a reaction to the effects of Taiwanization, which Hakkas felt promoted the culture of the Hoklo people at the expense of Hakka and aboriginal culture. In politics, some Hakka activists perceived the Democratic Progressive Party (DPP) as a "Hoklo-only party", given that the language of the DPP rallies, meetings, and protests is Taiwanese Hokkien. On the other hand, the Kuomintang was perceived to represent primarily mainlander interests.

References

External links
  (archive)

2006 establishments in Taiwan
Political parties established in 2006
Political parties in Taiwan
Political parties of minorities
Hakka culture in Taiwan
Social democratic parties in Taiwan